Lovers' Rock is a 1964 Taiwanese drama film written and directed by Lei Pan. The film was selected as the Taiwanese entry for the Best Foreign Language Film at the 37th Academy Awards, but was not accepted as a nominee.

Cast
 Chiao Chuang as Chin Yu
 Cheng Pei-pei as Lin Chiu-tzu
 Hsang Tsung-hsin as Su Ta-kuei
 Wu Wei as Hui Tan

See also
 List of submissions to the 37th Academy Awards for Best Foreign Language Film
 List of Taiwanese submissions for the Academy Award for Best Foreign Language Film

References

External links
 

1964 films
1964 drama films
Taiwanese drama films
2010s Mandarin-language films